House at 137 Prospect Avenue is a historic home located at Sea Cliff in Nassau County, New York.  It was built about 1875 and is a two-story, rectangular clapboard residence with a combination of a cross-gable and shallow hipped roof in the Late Victorian style. It features a three-story tower with a multi-gabled roof and bracketed overhanging eaves.

It was listed on the National Register of Historic Places in 1988.

References

Houses on the National Register of Historic Places in New York (state)
Victorian architecture in New York (state)
Houses completed in 1875
Houses in Nassau County, New York
National Register of Historic Places in Nassau County, New York